Our Cubehouse Still Rocks is the 4th album by the Boston Spaceships, released in 2010. The title refers to a passage from Finnegans Wake, the classic modernist novel by James Joyce. This album is the highest rating Boston Spaceships release on metacritic, superseding 'Let It Beard'; This release is also the highest rating Robert Pollard project on the site, with his solo album, 'Lord Of The Birdcage,' being his highest rating album in general.

Track listing
All songs written by Robert Pollard.

Side A
Track Star - 3.08
John The Dwarf Wants To Become An Angel - 2.49
I See You Coming - 2.53
Fly Away (Terry Sez) - 2.46
Trick Of The Telekinetic Newlyweds - 2.36
Saints Don't Lie - 3.09
The British And The French - 1.45
Unshaven Bird - 2.28
Side B - 
Come On Baby Grace - 2.34
Freedom Rings - 3.53
Stunted - 2.12
Bombadine - 2.07
Airwaves - 2.29
Dunkirk Is Frozen - 2.44
King Green Stamp - 1.53
In The Bathroom (Up 1/2 The Night) - 3.08

Personnel
Robert Pollard - vocals
John Moen - drums, percussion
Chris Slusarenko - guitar, bass, keyboards

References

2010 albums
Boston Spaceships albums